The Félix Houphouët-Boigny Peace Prize was established in 1990 by UNESCO:

"to honour living individuals and active public or private bodies or institutions that have made a significant contribution to promoting, seeking, safeguarding or maintaining peace in conformity with the Charter of the United Nations and the Constitution of UNESCO."

The prize bears the name of Félix Houphouët-Boigny, the late former president of Côte d'Ivoire, who served from independence in 1960 until his death in 1993. It is awarded annually. The prize includes a cheque of USD 150,000, a gold medal and a peace diploma. If there are multiple recipients, the cheque is shared equally.

Recipients

References

External links 
 

Peace awards
UNESCO awards
Awards established in 1990